Photinus consanguineus is a species in the family Lampyridae ("fireflies"), in the order Coleoptera ("beetles").
It is found in North America.

References

Further reading
 Arnett, R.H. Jr., M. C. Thomas, P. E. Skelley and J. H. Frank. (eds.). (2002). American Beetles, Volume II: Polyphaga: Scarabaeoidea through Curculionoidea. CRC Press LLC, Boca Raton, FL.
 Luk, Stephen P. L., Stephen A. Marshall, and Marc A. Branham (2011). "The Fireflies of Ontario (Coleoptera: Lampyridae)". Canadian Journal of Arthropod Identification, no. 16, 1–105.
 McDermott, F. A. / Steel, W. O., ed. (1966). "Lampyridae". Coleopterorum Catalogus Supplementa, pars 9, 149.
 Richard E. White. (1983). Peterson Field Guides: Beetles. Houghton Mifflin Company.
 Ross H. Arnett. (2000). American Insects: A Handbook of the Insects of America North of Mexico. CRC Press.

External links
NCBI Taxonomy Browser, Photinus consanguineus

Lampyridae
Bioluminescent insects
Beetles described in 1852